The Women's 500m time trial, Classes 1-3 track cycling event at the 2012 Summer Paralympics took place on September 1 at London Velopark.

Results
WR = World Record

References

Women's time trial C4-5
2012 in women's road cycling